Laura Ruzgutė (born 9 October 1997) is a Lithuanian footballer who plays as a defender for the Lithuania national team.

Career
Ruzgutė has been capped for the Lithuania national team, appearing for the team during the 2019 FIFA Women's World Cup qualifying cycle.

References

External links
 
 
 

1997 births
Living people
Lithuanian women's footballers
Lithuania women's international footballers
Women's association football defenders